Great Northern Mall, is a single-level enclosed shopping mall in North Olmsted, Ohio, a suburb of Cleveland. Its anchor stores are Dick's, Dillard's, J. C. Penney, and Macy's.

History
Originally, a small outdoor shopping center was opened by Saul Biskind in 1958 on what was a field of strawberries.  The plaza contained a Sears (west end), F. W. Woolworth Company (center west), and a Pick-N-Pay grocery store (east end), along with a small-scale J. C. Penney and other stores.  A freestanding May Company Cleveland store was built to the east of the original plaza in 1965.

The enclosed mall was opened in 1976 and attached to the east end of the existing May Company building.  It featured new, larger J. C. Penney and Sears stores. In 1980, Hexalon Real Estate—an affiliate of what is now Unibail-Rodamco—became an investor in the mall.  The 1980s saw the opening of the Plaza South attached to the original strip (now renamed the Plaza) and the 1987 addition of the award-winning South Court to the mall.  Additionally, 2 mid-level hotels and several office facilities, such as Corporate Center and Technology Park, were built proximal to the retail facilities. These served to feed customers into the Mall and Plazas, as did the strategic location near Lorain Road, Brookpark Road, Great Northern Boulevard, and Interstate 480.

In 1991, Hexalon bought out the remaining Biskind stake in the mall and undertook a significant upgrade and remodel in 1992.  It hired The Edward J. DeBartolo Corporation as its management company until 2000, when Rodamco's Urban Shopping Centers assumed management.  The Biskind family, which had retained the Plazas, eventually sold them to DDR Corp. in 1997.

May Company Cleveland was renamed Kaufmann's in 1993, and became Macy's in 2006. The Westfield Group acquired the shopping center in early 2002, and renamed it "Westfield Shoppingtown Great Northern."  Dillard's was added on March 19, 2003, expanding the South Court into a full-fledged new wing.  Westfield dropped "Shoppingtown" from the mall's name in June 2005, around the time that a newly built  Dick's Sporting Goods (originally planned to be Galyan's) opened.

The original food court, which had been located between Sears and J. C. Penney, was moved adjacent to Dick's in 2011.  In March 2013, construction began at site of the original food court for a 10-screen Regal Entertainment Group movie theater, three new restaurants, and extra renovations; this addition was completed by December of that year.  The mall was sold to Starwood Retail Partners, a subsidiary of Starwood Capital Group, in the midst of construction.

On July 1, 2020, it was announced that Sears would be closing as part of a plan to close 28 stores nationwide. The store closed August 21, 2020.  This was the last Sears store in Ohio, besides a Sears Hometown Store in Norwalk, which is closing in 2023 as part of a plan to close all Sears Hometown stores.

The mall became managed by Pacific Retail Capital Partners in 2020.

On December 10, 2022, Regal Cinemas announced plans to close along with 23 theaters in the United States. The theater closed down on January 26, 2023.

References

External links
Official Great Northern Mall website

Shopping malls in Cuyahoga County, Ohio
Shopping malls established in 1976
1976 establishments in Ohio